Pravetz computers (in Bulgarian shortly: Правец) are the Bulgarian personal computers produced from 1979 that were widely used in scientific organizations and schools until the late 1990s.

Pravets are actually the first personal computers in Bulgaria, although before that, various types of large computer-computing systems were used, the size of rooms (60-70), as well as even lamp computers before that. The name of the Pravet computers specifies that these are Personal Computers "made" (in Bulgarian language: правя, pravja) in Bulgaria.

They were manufactured in the town of Pravetz, with some components and software being produced in other towns as Sofia, Plovdiv, Stara Zagora and other Bulgarian cities.

Pravetz computers are still in use in some schools for beginner students in computing because they are adapted in manufacturing for educational purposes.

Bulgaria was the leading manufacturer, with its leading trademark Pravetz, of computer and periferals electronics for the socialist economic union COMECON in 20th century.

History 
An early Bulgarian-made personal computer was IMKO-1 (its name resembles Bulgarian name ELKA (short name for ELektronen KAlkulator, cirillic ЕЛКА ЕЛектронен КАлкулатор) or calculator, yet the name of the first state manufactured Personal computers points to its production as a PC or Pravetz Computers (правя, pravja - make, manufacture). The prototype of the Pravetz computers that were developed by engineer Ivan Vassilev Marangozov, who was rightfully accused of cloning the Apple II. In fact, IMKO-1 was a nearly identical clone of the original Apple 2 with a few minor exceptions - case, keyboard, character table (the lower case Latin alphabet was replaced with Cyrillic upper case) and power supply (early models used bulky and heavy linear power supplies). A few early models were produced at the ITKR (pronounced ee-teh-kah-reh, Institute of Technical Cybernetics and Robotics), a section of the Bulgarian Academy of Sciences. Industrial production in Pravetz started shortly after.

The line of Bulgarian personal computers at the time of release was prohibitively expensive for individuals and in addition were only sold to different government institutions - educational sector, military and administrative sector.

Pravetz computers were of major importance in the economy of the Comecon.

Model line

8-bit architecture 

Except for the Oric-derived 8D (and possibly the IMKO-1), all the Pravetz 8-bit systems are largely compatible with the popular Apple II and its successors, with the exception that they offer Cyrillic fonts and some other improvements compared to Apple.

Before Pravetz were IMKO-1 (IMKO-2) — According to some computer users, IMKO was the very First Bulgarian personal computer, its name resembles the ELKA name for calculator. It used a clone of the MOS Technology 6502 CPU running at 1 MHz and 16/4 KB of RAM/ROM. The storage media is a cassette recorder. It had a metal case and very large and heavy linear power supply. The ROM was an exact copy of the Apple 2 ROM (the only change was the name).
 Pravetz 82 - is one of the first Pravetz Computers, PC, that were named so to be clear to be the Personal Computers, PC in Bulgaria), 82 is the model year. BASIC interpreter, RAM/ROM - 48/12 KB; CPU Synertek 6502 /1 MHz. The storage is improved due to the availability of (optional) 5.25" floppy disk drive(s). They had yellow plastic case and black keyboards. The later revisions used switching power supplies. ROM and schematics were not changed and were identical to those of the Apple II. A lot of the chips used were Bulgarian and Soviet substitutes (clones) of the original chips. Pravetz 82 was relatively reliable - most of the hardware problems were due to the widespread use of sub-standard quality IC sockets, mainly used for the DRAM chips.
 Pravetz 8М - Integrated second CPU Zilog Z80A at 4 MHz to be able to run CP/M and its software. The military version features integrated terminal design. It was essentially a version of Apple II+ with the optional CP/M card integrated on the motherboard. It had 64K of RAM on-board, a switching power supply and an off-white plastic case with an improved design.  
 Pravetz 8E - Industrial model based on the original Pravetz 82 architecture plus some memory extensions
 Pravetz 8А - Uses Bulgarian-made chipset СМ 630, memory could be expanded up to 1 Mb using optional memory card, accessible in 64Kb banks. It was a nearly identical clone of Apple //e on electrical diagrams and ROM content levels. The case was similar to the one used for the 8M model. The keyboard was improved with arrow buttons, and the Char table included Cyrillic upper and lower case symbols. This was the most advanced model with the greatest level of upgradeability.
 Pravetz 8С - "streamlined version" of the 8А model. 128 KB RAM integrated, but not expandable. Fewer slots, but all essential controllers were integrated on the motherboard -  Parallel (Centronics) interface, FDD controllers, Joystick and sometimes with RS-232. A version of 8C is the Pravetz 8VC, which features a terminal-like design.
 Pravetz 8D - 8 bit home computer, based on 6502 and VIA 6522. It used a TV set instead of a computer monitor. Not compatible with Pravetz 82 but inherits its architecture from the English Oric Atmos home computers and compatible with their software.

16-bit architecture 

Pravetz-16 were IBM PC compatible:

Pravetz-16 (IMKO-4) - Featured Intel 8088 at 4.77 MHz. Simple motherboard design with Bulgarian chipset. Standard RAM 256KB or 512KB expandable to 640KB.
Pravetz-16E
Pravetz-16ES (variations as a desktop or tower box) - Featured the 80186 processor at 8 MHz.
Pravetz-16A
Pravetz-16T - Turbo version
Pravetz-286

32-bit architecture 
Pravetz-386
Pravetz-486

See also
History of computer hardware in Bulgaria

References

External links
 Website about Pravetz computers (historical)

Information technology in Bulgaria
Goods manufactured in Bulgaria
Bulgarian brands
Personal computers
Home computers
Apple II clones
Computer-related introductions in 1979
Manufacturing companies of Bulgaria